Skalná (until 1950 Vildštejn) is a town in Cheb District in the Karlovy Vary Region of the Czech Republic. It has about 1,900 inhabitants.

Administrative parts
Villages of Kateřina, Starý Rybník, Vonšov and Zelená are administrative parts of Skalná.

Etymology
The original German name Wildstein (i.e. "wild rock") is most likely derived from the location of the town on a rocky promontory, and from the abundance of game in the forests. The Czech name Vildštejn was created by transcription. After the World War II, the town was renamed Skalná (from skála, i.e. "rock").

Geography
It lies on the border with Germany.

The eastern part of the municipal territory lies in the Cheb Basin, the western part lies in the Fichtel Mountains.

History
The first written mention of Skalná is from 1224. The settlement was founded around 1200 in the sub-castle area of Vildštejn Castle. It was owned by various noble families, most notably by the House of Gumerauer (1439–1524), by the Wirsberg family (1531–1590s), who made history not only as robbers, but also as builders of a new church and Renaissance castle, and by the Trauttenberg family (1590s–1799).

Demographics

Sights

The Romanesque Vildštejn Castle was founded in 1166. It was inhabited until the 19th century, when it was transformed into a malting plant. Today it is a museum.

The Soos National Nature Reserve is nicknamed "Czech Yellowstone". It is an extensive peat bog and moor, where a large number of mineral springs and pure carbon dioxide spring up in the form of mofettas. There is an educational trail leading along the bottom of a dry lake, which had salt water.

The Church of Saint John the Baptist was originally a Gothic structure founded by the Teutonic Order, first mentioned in 1320. In 1705–1709, it was rebuilt in the Baroque style.

In Starý Rybník there are a chateau and ruins of a Gothic castle.

Notable people
Sigmund von Birken (1626–1681), German poet
Johann Goldfuß (1908–1970), German luthier
Pavel Nedvěd (born 1972), footballer, 2003 Ballon d'Or winner

Twin towns – sister cities

Skalná is twinned with:
 Neusorg, Germany

References

External links

Cities and towns in the Czech Republic
Populated places in Cheb District